The Peak Forest Tramway was an early horse- and gravity-powered industrial railway (or tramway) system in Derbyshire, England. Opened for trade on 31 August 1796, it remained in operation until the 1920s. Much of the route and the structures associated with the line remain. The western section of the line is now the route of the Peak Forest Tramway Trail.

Its purpose was to carry limestone from the vast quarries around Dove Holes down to Bugsworth Basin via Chapel-en-le-Frith and Chinley, where much of it was taken by boat along the Peak Forest Canal and the Ashton Canal to Manchester and beyond. The remaining limestone was put into lime kilns at Bugsworth where it was converted into quick lime (or burnt lime).

Construction
Built by Benjamin Outram, the tramway was initially single-track, on a  gauge, constructed of stone sleeper blocks and L-section cast-iron rails that were fastened directly onto the blocks, in the same manner as his Little Eaton Gangway built for the Derby Canal. The rails, known as gang rails or plates, were provided by Benjamin Outram and Company who also supplied the mineral waggons.

From Bugsworth it rose  to Whitehough, then proceeded to Chapel Milton on the level. After a more gentle slope to Barmoor Clough the line proceeded to the Dove Holes quarries.

To aid acceleration from the top, and braking at the foot, the inclined plane varied from 1 in 6 at the top to 1 in 12 at the base. It was intended to be, at least partly, self-acting with descending wagons counterbalanced to some extent by partly loaded wagons being drawn up. Initially rope was tried, followed by a patent twisted chain, passing round a wheel, with a brake to control it, in a pit at the top. Eventually a chain with  links was purchased from Birmingham, which proved more equal to the work. By the beginning of the 20th century this had been replaced by a steel rope.

There was another small incline of  within the quarry complex worked by a horse-gin at the top and a continuous rope.

The mineral waggons were originally similar to those used for the earlier Little Eaton Gangway, with a substantial wooden chassis with a wrought-iron body held in place by two wooden wedges. The axles were bolted onto axle trees and the cast-iron wheels (about 20 inches in diameter) were held on the axles by a linchpin (known as a "lily-pin"). Later the bodies were fixed with a door at the back, unloading by means of a tippler mechanism mounted on a turntable.

From the bottom of the plane to Bugsworth Basin, a team of four horses could draw up to twenty wagons.

History

In 1803 the tramway was made double-track, with the exception of Stodhart Tunnel and below Buxton Road Bridge, using the same method of fixing the rails.

Problems were experienced because the rails became loose, and to overcome these the main line was relaid between 1832 and 1837 using pedestals or saddles placed between the rails and the stone sleeper blocks.

In 1846 the MSLR's predecessor, the Sheffield, Ashton-under-Lyne and Manchester Railway, took on a £9,325 a year perpetual lease of the Peak Forest Canal, including the tramway. The railway became owner of the canal in 1883. The tramway closed in 1920 and its rails and waggons were sold by the LNER.

The most important surviving features of the tramway are the elevated tramway branch at Bugsworth Basin, Stodhart Tunnel and the self-acting inclined plane at Chapel-en-le-Frith, known as the Chapel inclined plane. The elevated tramway branch forms part of the Scheduled Ancient Monument of Bugsworth Basin. It was believed that the Grade II* listed Stodhart Tunnel was the oldest railway tunnel in the world until archaeological work on the Butterley Gangroad (also in Derbyshire) in May 2013 suggested that Fritchley Tunnel on that line was older than Stodhart Tunnel. A wagon is on display in the York Railway Museum and a wheel and track items at the Narrow Gauge Railway Museum.

References
Schofield, R.B., (2000) Benjamin Outram, Cardiff: Merton Priory Press

Further reading

External links

Map and aerial photo sources for:  - Bugsworth Basin and  - Dove Holes

maps, photos and history of tramway
1927 photo of Bugsworth basin wagons and wagon tippler
Guide to Peak Forest Tramway Trail cycle path with photos of current route

Early British railway companies
Transport in Derbyshire
Canals in England
Horse-drawn railways
Tram transport in England
Industrial railways in England
Railway lines opened in 1796
4 ft 2 in gauge railways in England
Manchester, Sheffield and Lincolnshire Railway
1796 establishments in England